A Mermaid in Paris is a 2020 fantasy romantic comedy film directed by Mathias Malzieu, who co-wrote the script alongside Stéphane Landowski. The film stars Nicolas Duvauchelle and Marilyn Lima.

The film was released in France on 11 March 2020 by Sony Pictures Releasing.

Premise
A man rescues a mermaid in Paris and slowly falls in love with her.

Cast
 Nicolas Duvauchelle as Gaspard
 Marilyn Lima as Lula
 Romane Bohringer as Milena
 Rossy de Palma as Rossy
 Tchéky Karyo as Camille
 Alexis Michalik as Victor

Production
Principal photography began on 29 August 2019 and concluded on 17 October 2019. Filming took place in a studio in Macedonia over a period of five weeks, followed by two weeks of location shooting in Paris and Étretat, France.

Reception
Wilson Kwong of Film Inquiry reviewed the film positively, stating, "A Mermaid in Paris is a refreshingly original film about what it means to believe in the things you love, and in doing that, makes a strong argument of why you should love the film itself." Eye for Films Amber Wilkinson scored the film 3/5, saying, "You can get a way with a lot when you deliver it with this much panache."

References

External links
 

2020 films
2020 fantasy films
2020 romantic comedy films
2020s English-language films
2020s fantasy comedy films
2020s French-language films
Belgian fantasy comedy films
Belgian romantic comedy films
English-language French films
English-language Belgian films
English-language Macedonian films
EuropaCorp films
Films about mermaids
Films set in Paris
Films shot in Normandy
Films shot in Paris
French fantasy comedy films
French romantic comedy films
French romantic fantasy films
French-language Belgian films
Macedonian comedy films
2020s French films